Parliamentary elections were held in Iraq between 10 December 1936 and 20 February 1937 to elect the members of Chamber of Deputies of Iraq.

Background 
After the 1936 military coup led by Bakr Sidqi, disagreement between the parliament led by deposed Prime Minister Yasin al-Hashimi and the left-leaning military government presided over by Hikmat Sulayman, led to the dissolution of parliament on 31 October 1936. The new elections started in December 1936 and were complete by 20 February 1937.

Results
A bloc supportive of coup leader Bakr Sidqi and members of the leftist Popular Reform Party won the elections and were the most prominent political groups in the new parliament. Both groups supported Hikmat Sulayman's government. The new parliaments also included military officers, tribal leaders, nationalists and independent members. Later, the Popular Reform Party was accused of having communist ideology, and was dissolved.

Aftermath
Bakr Sidqi and another coup leader were assassinated on 12 August 1937 in Mosul. After losing the support of the military,  Sulayman resigned on 17 August 1937. Parliament was dissolved on 26 August 1937 and fresh elections were held on 18 December 1937.

References 

Iraq
Iraq
1936 in Iraq
1937 in Iraq
Elections in Iraq